Federal Route 64 or Benta–Jengka–Maran Highway (Malay: Jalan Benta–Jengka–Maran) is the main federal roads in Pahang, Malaysia. The road connects Benta in the west to Maran in the east.

Route background 
The Kilometre Zero of the Federal Route 64 starts at Benta.

Features

At most sections, the Federal Route 64 was built under the JKR R5 road standard, allowing maximum speed limit of up to 90 km/h.

List of junctions and towns

References

064